Wolmar is a surname. Notable people with the surname include:
 Bent Wolmar (born 1937), Danish footballer
 Christian Wolmar (born 1949), British journalist, politician and railway historian
  (1933–2019), actor
  (1497–1560)

See also Valmiera, city in Latvia.